Park Jin-Ok  (born 28 May 1982) is a South Korean football player who plays for Gwangju FC in the K League Challenge.

External links 

1982 births
Living people
South Korean footballers
Jeju United FC players
Gimcheon Sangmu FC players
Daejeon Hana Citizen FC players
K League 1 players
K League 2 players
Kyung Hee University alumni
Association football midfielders